was a Japanese music (ryūkōka) singer and soldier. He was known for using naniwa-bushi's kobushi vocalism in Japanese popular music. He was killed in action during the eastern New Guinea campaign during the Pacific War.

Life
Uehara was born as Rikiji Matsumoto in Ōdate, Akita Prefecture, Japan. He graduated from Senshu University, and made his professional debut with the song  under the Japanese division of Polydor Records in 1936. His famous songs included the 1937 song . His vocal style, called kobushi, became popular as the more emphatic form among modern enka singers.

Uehara became a soldier in 1943, went to New Guinea, and was killed in battle on July 29, 1944.

Legacy
In 1976, a monument honoring him was established in his home city of Ōdate.

Discography
 : 1937
 : 1937
 : 1938
 : 1938
 : 1938
 : 1938
 : 1938 with Taro Shoji
 : 1939
 : 1939
 : 1941

References

1908 births
1944 deaths
Imperial Japanese Army personnel of World War II
Japanese military personnel killed in World War II
Musicians from Akita Prefecture
20th-century Japanese male singers
20th-century Japanese singers